Nupserha conradti is a species of beetle in the family Cerambycidae. It was described by Hermann Julius Kolbe in 1894.

Varietas
 Nupserha conradti var. immaculatifrons Breuning, 1950
 Nupserha conradti var. atroabdominalis Breuning, 1961

References

conradti
Beetles described in 1894
Taxa named by Hermann Julius Kolbe